Joseph Harb (1940 – 9 February 2014) was a Lebanese poet and writer.

Early years
Born into the family of a police officer, he moved quite often from Alnakoora to Soor to Tarazieh in Qadaa Jebayel where he, with his sister Josephine, went to Dar Elrahbat 'Nuns School' for five years. There he was the only boy in his class. He used to read the scriptures and that exposed him to the Arabic language.

Poetry
Harb wrote and published his first poetry book/Diwan when he was 17 years old.  As was his friend Ziad Rahbani Harb was a Marxist. They both worked on a number of songs which Fairuz has performed. Harb also wrote poems which the late Philemon Wehbe composed and Fairuz also sang. There are other songs which he wrote and late Riad Al Sunbati composed but haven't been disclosed yet.   Harb also wrote for a number of television series.  He was the general manager of the Lebanese Writers Organization/Union since December 1997.  His poems can be found in the numerous poetry books he wrote or in Fairuz' songs like "Belayl we Chiti", "Chante Philemon Wehbe" and other albums.

Awards & honors 
 The Lebanese Literature Award

References

Lebanese male poets
1940s births
2014 deaths
20th-century Lebanese poets
20th-century male writers